Highway 5A is Highway 5's pre-1986 alignment south of Kamloops.  Unlike the four-six lane Highway 5 freeway, the 182 km (113 mi) long Highway 5A is only two lanes, with one four lane section between Highway 5 and Highway 97C approximately running for 23 km (14 mi).

Route details

Starting at the junction of the Crowsnest Highway (Highway 3) in Princeton, Highway 5A goes through  of undeveloped land north to its junction with the Okanagan Connector (Highway 97C) at Aspen Grove. Past Aspen Grove, Highway 5A and Highway 97C travel in a shared designation northwest for 23 km (14 mi) in a four lane alignment before intersecting the Coquihalla Highway 5 and Highway 8 at Merritt.  After a  gap, Highway 5A continues north northeast for 89 km (55 mi), passing through the community of Quilchena, before terminating within Kamloops at its junction with Highways 5, 1 and 97 (which are overlapped at the point where 5A terminates).

Highway 5A used to circle through Merritt for 7 km (4 mi), following Nicola Street (Highways 8 and 97C) and Voght Street, to its second crossover of Highway 5 in the north area of Merritt; however, it was dropped by the province in 2008. The two segments can be access by either traveling through Merritt or following Highway 5.

Highway 5A is often considered to be a back country highway due to its low traffic volumes and features unusual to highways (e.g. cattleguards). Highway 5A between Aspen Grove and Merritt saw major upgrades in the late 1980s to prepare for the opening of the Okanagan Connector, but still remained two lanes for several years after. When the Okanagan Connector opened on October 1, 1990, the Hamilton Hill section was moved to a new four lane alignment north of the former route. Controversial plans once called for the Okanagan Connector to continue past Aspen Grove and Highway 5A to meet with Highway 5 south of Merritt. When it became apparent that this extension was unlikely, the highway was four lanes in stages from Aspen Grove to the Hamilton Hill Brake Check. Although upgraded for Okanagan Connector traffic, Highway 5A from Aspen Grove to Merritt is not considered to be a freeway, due to its numerous at-grade intersections and undivided nature. The speed limit on this stretch is 110 km/h, which is 10 km/h lower than both the Okanagan Connector and the Coquihalla Highways.

Major intersections
From south to north:

References

External links 
 Official Numbered Routes in British Columbia by British Columbia Driving & Transportation

05A
Similkameen Country
Nicola Country
005A
Transport in Kamloops